Luke Erceg (born 11 August 1993) is an Australian actor. He appeared on the children's television show Mortified (2006–2007) and A Gurls Wurld (2009).

References

1993 births
Living people
Australian male television actors
Male actors from New South Wales